ASTERIG is the English acronym for Assessment Tool to Measure and Evaluate the Risk Potential of Gambling Products. It was initially developed in Germany from 2006 to 2010 and became validated globally in 2013 under the head of the Columbia University, New York, USA.

Background
Gambling and betting is an important part of many people’s lives as it gives them great pleasure all over the world. However, every gambling and betting product can have negative consequences; some individuals develop a recurrent, maladaptive pattern of gambling behaviour which can develop into pathological gambling. The individual risk depends on the personality of the player as well as on the characteristics of the gambling product. So, the addiction risk of e.g. a lottery should differ fundamentally from that of a slot machine, whereby criteria such as the size and frequency of a jackpot or the type of offer (offline versus online) can significantly influence the risk potential.

Problematic gambling behaviour is more than just an individual problem. It is often associated with financial losses, disruption of affected families as well as interpersonal relationships, and accompanied by psychiatric disorders. Thus, it can evolve into a social affair that affects the entire personal environment of the pathological player or even the respective national economy.

ASTERIG is a systematic measuring and evaluation tool to assess the addiction risk potential of different gambling products. The tool uses numeric scores to measure how high the addiction risk potential of a gambling product can be and highlights where the specific risk potential of each specific gambling product is located. Therefore, ten non-significantly intercorrelating parameters are considered and weighted according to the strength of their influence. It thus allows a mathematical-objective comparison of possible addiction risk potentials between different, possibly also similar gambling products. Additionally, ASTERIG accentuates where exactly, this means, at which characteristic or characteristics of the respective game of chance, the addiction risk potential can be promoted or reduced.

ASTERIG offers the possibility of conducting a quantitative comparison in the form of a systematic measurement and evaluation instrument with comparable scores, more specifically, a comparatively evaluable scale. The tool helps both legislators and jurisprudence as well as the administrative practice in the countries and states, which publicly permit and offer gambling and betting. A scientifically substantiated classification of gambling products into comparatively measurable risk levels is undisputed, also in an international context. Similar research has been carried out in the UK, Finland and Sweden. But as their theoretical or empirical foundations have not yet been published, the scientific assessment of these instruments is difficult.

ASTERIG was originally developed by Franz Wilhelm Peren and Reiner Clement. ASTERIG has been globally validated by:

See also 

 game of chance
 online gambling
 problem gambling

Further reading 

 Franz W. Peren: Assessment Tool to Measure and Evaluate the Risk Potential of Gambling Products: ASTERiG. In: Gaming Law Review and Economics, 15(11), 2011, pp. 671-679

 Franz W. Peren, Reiner Clement: Evaluation of the Pathological Potential of Gambling Products. In: Gaming Law Review and Economics, 16(4), 2012, pp. 178-183

 Franz W. Peren, Reiner Clement: Evaluation of the pathologic potential of gambling products. In: The Journal of Gambling Business and Economics, 5(3), 2013, pp. 44-54

 Franz W. Peren: Assessment Tool to Measure and Evaluate the Risk Potential of Gambling Products: ASTERiG. In: The Journal of Gambling Business and Economics, 5(2), 2013, pp. 10-22

 Carlos Blanco, Alex Blaszczynski, Reiner Clement, Jeffrey Derevensky, Anna E. Goudriaan, David C. Hodgins, Ruth J. van Holst, Angela Ibanez, Silvia S. Martins, Chantal Moersen, Sabrina Molinaro, Adrian Parke, Franz W. Peren, Nancy M. Petry, Heather Wardle: Assessment Tool to Measure and Evaluate the Risk Potential of Gambling Products ASTERiG. In: The Journal of Gambling Business and Economics, 7(1), 2013, pp. 73-87

 Carlos Blanco, Alex Blaszczynski, Reiner Clement, Jeffrey Derevensky, Anna E. Goudriaan, David C. Hodgins, Ruth J. van Holst, Ángela Ibáñez, Silvia S. Martins, Chantal Moersen, Sabrina Molinaro, Adrian Parke, Franz W. Peren, Nancy M. Petry, Heather Wardle: Assessment Tool to Measure and Evaluate the Risk Potential of Gambling Products, ASTERIG: A Global Validation. In: Gaming Law Review and Economics, 17(9), 2013, pp. 635-642

 Judit Tessényi, Franz W. Peren: ASTERIG. A szerencsejáték-termékek függőségi kockázatainak egy lehetséges mérése és empirikus vizsgálata a Magyarországon kínált szerencsejátékokra. In: Alkalmazott pszichológia, 15(4), 2015, pp. 47-56

References

Weblinks 

 eASTERIG, University of Sydney, School of Public Health (Archived, 3 February 2014, in Internet Archive)
 Westlotto (Westdeutsche Lotterie GmbH & Co. OHG): Responsible Gaming Report 2011

Gambling and society